Vincenzo Ι Gonzaga (21 September 1562 – 9 February 1612) was ruler of the Duchy of Mantua and the Duchy of Montferrat from 1587 to 1612.

Biography
Vincenzo was the only son of Guglielmo Gonzaga, Duke of Mantua, and Archduchess Eleanor of Austria. His maternal grandparents were Ferdinand I, Holy Roman Emperor, and Anna of Bohemia and Hungary.

In 1582, Vincenzo murdered in cold blood the brilliant young Scottish polymath James Crichton, an employee of his father's court, of whom Vincenzo had become crazed with jealousy.

Vincenzo was a major patron of the arts and sciences, and turned Mantua into a vibrant cultural center. On 22 September 1587, Vincent was crowned the fourth Duke of Mantua, with a glitzy ceremony in which were present the highest authority of the duchy to pay homage to the new Duke of Mantua: he then moved with a ride through the city streets. Vincenzo employed the composer Claudio Monteverdi and the painter Peter Paul Rubens. In 1590 Monteverdi became a viol-player and cantor in the music chapel of Vincenzo; in 1602 Vincenzo appointed him master of music on the death of Benedetto Pallavicino. Vincenzo was also a friend of the poet Torquato Tasso. A small book published in Verona in 1589 describes how a comic actor named Valerini in the service of Vincenzo imagines an ideal gallery of art, in which statues of the most important art collectors are featured rather than the work of the artists themselves. Vincenzo was described as a colossus who would dominate the entire ideal gallery, called the Celestial Gallery of Minerva.

The astronomer Giovanni Antonio Magini also served as tutor to Vincenzo's sons, Francesco and Ferdinando.

Magini's life's work was the preparation of the Atlante geografico d'Italia (Geographic Atlas of Italy), printed posthumously by Magini's son in 1620. This was intended to include maps of each Italian region with exact nomenclature and historical notes. A major project, its production (begun in 1594) proved. Vincenzo, to whom the atlas is dedicated, assisted him with this project and allowed for maps of the various states of Italy to be brought to Magini.

During the winter of 1603–1604, Galileo visited the Mantuan court in an effort to obtain a position there, and was offered a salary, but could not agree on the terms with Vincenzo, who instead presented Galileo with a gold chain and two silver dishes.

Vincenzo's spendthrift habits are considered to have accelerated Mantua's economic and cultural decline.

At the age of 46, Vincenzo was rumored to have been impotent and he is said to have sent a secret expedition to the New World in order to obtain a legendary aphrodisiac.

On 20 July 1588, Emperor Rudolf II granted Vincenzo the right to an escutcheon of Austria, surmounted by an archducal coronet. Vincenzo created the Order of the Redemptor (or of the Most Precious Blood), approved by Pope Paul V, on 25 May 1608.

In 1608, to appease the continuous demands of the Duke of Savoy, Vincenzo agreed to a political marriage between his first son and heir, Francesco Gonzaga, and the Duke of Savoy's daughter, Margaret of Savoy. For Vincenzo, this marriage had the political objective of warming the "cold" relations that existed between the two courts of Mantua and Turin.

Issue 

Vincenzo married Margherita Farnese in 1581; their marriage was childless and they divorced. On 29 April 1584 he married his first cousin Eleonora de' Medici, the daughter of Francesco I de' Medici and Joanna of Austria.

Vincenzo and Eleonora's marriage produced six children. They were:
Francesco (7 May 1586 – 22 December 1612), who ruled as Francesco IV Gonzaga, Duke of Mantua, and Duke of Montferrat between 9 February and 22 December 1612.
Ferdinando (26 April 1587 – 29 October 1626), who ruled as Ferdinando I Gonzaga, Duke of Mantua, and Duke of Montferrat from 1612 until his death.
Guglielmo Domenico (4 April 1589 – 12 May 1591), nicknamed "(Lungaspada)", Marquis of Monferrato. Died in infancy.
Margherita (2 October 1591 – 7 February 1632), wife of Henry II, Duke of Lorraine
Vincenzo (7 January 1594 – 25 December 1627), ruled as Vincenzo II Gonzaga, Duke of Mantua, and Marquess of Montferrat from 1626 until his death.
Eleonora (23 September 1598 – 27 June 1655), second wife of Ferdinand II, Holy Roman Emperor.

He had several illegitimate children, including:

By the noble , wife of Prospero del Carretto:
 Francesco Gonzaga (1588-1673), bishop of Nola in 1657
 Silvio (1592-1612), Knight of Malta, the court poet Mantovana, and Marquis Cavriana.
 Giovanni (? -1679), Minister of Ferdinando Carlo Gonzaga to Turin, where he had the 'task to prevent the riding of Ercole Mattioli for the sale of Monferrato to France of Louis XIV.
 Eleanora, nun.

By the noble , daughter of Tullo Guerrieri:
 Francesca.

Honours
 Grand Master of the Order of the Redeemer
 Knight of the Order of the Golden Fleece

Notes

References

Sources

External links

Is Vincenzo I Gonzaga impotent?: The Medici Archives
Museo di Mantova: Heraldic Arms

|-

|-

1562 births
1612 deaths
Vincenzo 1
Vincenzo 1
Vincenzo 1
16th-century Italian nobility
17th-century Italian nobility
People of the Long Turkish War